Samari may refer to:

Places
Samari, Nepal
Samari, a neighborhood of Cap-Haïtien, Haiti, site of the 2021 Cap-Haïtien fuel tanker explosion

People
Samari Rolle (born 1976), American football player
Ali Samari (born 1993), Iranian shot putter
Bader Al Samari (born 1974), Saudi screenwriter and novelist

See also
Samaris (disambiguation)
Samurai (disambiguation)